Bruce Lee Fights Back from the Grave, originally released as Visitor of America, is a 1976 Bruceploitation supernatural martial arts film starring tae kwon do instructor Jun Chong (credited as 케리・郑 Ke-li Chong in the original South Korean version and as Bruce K. L. Lea in the English-dubbed and altered U.S. edit). The film was directed by Lee Doo-yong, though persistent misinformation claims that the movie was directed by Italian horror director Umberto Lenzi.

Plot overview
The opening sequence (which was filmed separately and added to the original South Korean film when the film was dubbed into English) shows Bruce Lee (played by an unknown imitator), leaping from his grave after it is struck by lightning. While this and the title imply a story involving Bruce Lee returning from the afterlife in order to do battle, the rest of the movie revolves around a plot that has nothing to do with Bruce Lee. Instead, it talks about a certain Wong Han, a Korean man trying to discover the truth behind the death of his brother, Han Ji-Hyeok. He travels to Los Angeles and allies himself with a woman named Suzanne. Han is harassed by a number of petty criminals and thugs in his attempt to find out the truth about his brother. Eventually, he begins to suspect that Ji-Hyeok is still alive and involved in a criminal racket.

Cast
 Jun Chong (credited as 케리・郑 Ke-li Chong / Bruce K. L. Lea) as Wong Han
 Deborah Dutch as Susanne
 Sho Kosugi as Suzuki

Regional differences
The version of the film seen on both the U.K. and U.S. VHS and DVD comes from an American edit of an English dub that was prepared in Hong Kong. 
Although the film was released in South Korea in 1976, it is unknown as to whether or not the film had a release in Chinese theaters.
The music score for the English-language version contains music lifted from the soundtracks to Rocky and Rollercoaster, two films not released until after the South Korean release date of this film. The sound effects on this version are typical of those often found in Hong Kong martial arts films at the time, rather than the sort that were heard in South Korean films. 
The script for the English dub makes repeated references to the Asian characters being Chinese, when the visual evidence indicates that they are Korean. 
The U.S. distributors added the infamous "Bruce Lee" opening sequence.

See also
 List of Hong Kong films
 List of martial arts films

References

External links
 
 
 
 Bruce Lee Fights Back from the Grave - Unofficial Fansite
 Korean Film Database entry

1976 films
1976 martial arts films
Bruceploitation films
South Korean supernatural thriller films
South Korean martial arts films
Films directed by Lee Doo-yong
1970s Korean-language films